Sila María González Calderón (born May 3, 1965 on San Juan, Puerto Rico) is a Puerto Rican attorney and former senator. She is the daughter of former Governor of Puerto Rico Sila Calderón, and served as her First Lady, along with her sister, María Elena. After that, she served as a member of the Senate of Puerto Rico from 2005 to 2013. She currently works as an attorney for the McConnell Valdés law firm.

Early years and University of Puerto Rico

Sila María González was born on May 3, 1965 on San Juan, Puerto Rico to engineer Francisco Xavier González and Sila Calderón. She studied elementary and junior high school at the Colegio Puertorriqueño de Niñas in Guaynabo, finishing high school at Saint John's School in Condado.

In 1987, she obtained her bachelor's degree in Economy from the University of Pennsylvania with a concentration on International Commerce from Wharton School of Economics. She continued studying law at Boston University, graduating in 1990. After passing the bar exam, she started working as an attorney in Massachusetts.

Professional career: 1990-2000

Sila María González worked as Assistant Regional Counsel in the Superfund area of the Environmental Protection Agency in Boston. In 1992, she returned to Puerto Rico and obtained the license to practice law in the island, on Federal Court, and on the Court of Appeals for the First Circuit in Boston.

She started working as a corporative attorney for the Ledesma, Palou & Miranda Law Firm, and then for O'Neill & Borges where she specialized in real estate and notary. She then worked for the Maldonado Nicolai Law Firm for two years, mostly on commercial closings for financial institutions.

Political career: 2004-2013

Sila María was elected to the Senate of Puerto Rico on the 2004 general elections. She was reelected on 2008. During her time in the Senate, she has been the speaker for commissions on Education, Family Affairs, Treasury, Government, and Ethics.

In September 2011, González announced she wouldn't run for a third term in the Senate citing a desire to return to her private life. In her statement, González remarked that she felt "shame" in being part of the 16th Legislative Assembly of Puerto Rico, which has faced the resignations of seven legislators due to public scandals of corruption, drug use, and others.

Return to private life

After finishing her term in the Senate, González returned to her profession as an attorney. In January 2013, it was announced that she would join the McConnell Valdés law firm. According to the firm website, González main areas of practice include general corporate work and government affairs.

Personal life

Sila María González has three children from her first marriage. During her time as First Lady, she was in a relationship with reporter Ramón "Papo" Brenes. She was also in a brief relationship with fellow senator Héctor Martínez Maldonado. In 2012, she confirmed she was in a relationship with businessman Manuel Rivera González with whom she planned to marry.

References

External links
 Hon. Sila M. González Biography on SenadoPR

1965 births
Living people
Members of the Senate of Puerto Rico
Popular Democratic Party (Puerto Rico) politicians
Puerto Rican party leaders
Puerto Rican lawyers